Rebecca is a 1963 Indian Malayalam-language film, directed and produced by Kunchacko. The film stars Sathyan, Rajasri and B. S. Saroja.

Plot

Cast 
Sathyan as Johny
Rajasree as Rebecca
Boban Kunchacko
Jijo
Bahadoor as Lazer
B. S. Saroja
Kottayam Chellappan as Mathew
Pala Thankam as Maria
S. J. Dev
Gangadharan Nair

Soundtrack 
The music was composed by K. Raghavan and the lyrics were written by Vayalar Ramavarma.

References

External links 
 

1963 films
1960s Malayalam-language films
Films about Christianity